Nioclás Tóibín (5 February 1928 – 19 September 1994) was a sean-nós singer from the Déise tradition of County Waterford in Ireland. Nioclás was winner of Corn Chomhlucht an Oideachais consecutively from 1961 to 1963. The corn was the principal national singing prize in Ireland at the time.

Born in the Gaeltacht parish of An Rinn (Ring) in County Waterford. His father and mother,Séamas Tóibín and Maighréad Ní Sheanacháin, were well known singers in the sean-nós style who had inherited the tradition from their own parents. Nioclás was known to sing songs such as 'Ar Éirinn Ní Neosfainn Cé Hí', 'Na Connerys' and 'Róisín Dubh'.

See also
Traditional Irish Singers

References

External links
 Nioclás Tóibín
 Nioclás singing Róisín Dubh (on YouTube)
 Portrait of Nioclás on TG4 (on YouTube) in Irish

1928 births
1994 deaths
20th-century Irish male singers
Musicians from County Waterford
Sean-nós singers